Zachary Petrick (born July 29, 1989) is an American professional baseball pitcher. He has played in Nippon Professional Baseball (NPB) for the Yokohama DeNA BayStars.

Career
Petrick graduated from Morris Community High School in Morris, Illinois. He then enrolled at Joliet Junior College. He transferred to the University of Northwestern Ohio, and was signed by the St. Louis Cardinals as an undrafted free agent.  He played the 2012 season with the Johnson City Cardinals of the Rookie-level Appalachian League.

Petrick began the 2013 season with the Peoria Chiefs of the Class A Midwest League, and received midseason promotions to the Palm Beach Cardinals of the Class A-Advanced Florida State League and Springfield Cardinals of the Class AA Texas League.  For the season, he combined a 7–3 record (W–L) with a 1.99 earned run average (ERA) and eight saves covering 34 appearances and 13 starts between Peoria, Palm Beach, and Springfield. Pitching at first in relief, his ERA at Peoria was 0.83 and Palm Beach 0.27.  At Springfield, he assumed a starting role.  In December, the Cardinals named Petrick their 2013 Minor League Pitcher of the Year.  "[At Springfield], after nine starts, he established himself for the season as our Minor League Pitcher of the year for 2013", commented Gary LaRocque, the Cardinals' farm director.

In December 2015, the Cardinals transferred the rights of Petrick to the Yokohama DeNA BayStars of Nippon Professional Baseball.

Personal
His brother, Billy Petrick, played in Major League Baseball for the Chicago Cubs in 2007.

References

External links

, or NPB
 

1989 births
Living people
American expatriate baseball players in Japan
American expatriate baseball players in South Korea
Baseball players from Illinois
Johnson City Cardinals players
KBO League pitchers
Memphis Redbirds players
Nippon Professional Baseball pitchers
Palm Beach Cardinals players
People from Morris, Illinois
Peoria Chiefs players
Samsung Lions players
Springfield Cardinals players
Yokohama DeNA BayStars players